Don Chedi is a district (amphoe) of Suphan Buri province, Thailand.

Geography
Neighboring districts are (from the north clockwise): Nong Ya Sai, Sam Chuk, Si Prachan, Mueang Suphan Buri and U Thong, and in Kanchanaburi province the district Lao Khwan.

History

Prince Damrong Rajanubhab in 1913 discovered the remains of a large chedi within the district. He identified it as the one built by King Naresuan in 1593 after his victory against the Burmese. The chedi was reconstructed in 1952. In 1959 a statue of the king on his war elephant cast by Silpa Bhirasri was added.

However, more recent research casts doubt on this identification. Although one of the chronicles explicitly places the battle at Suphan Buri, the others do not give a clear location. The Dutch merchant Jeremias van Vliet, however, wrote in his Short History of the Kings of Siam in 1640 that the battle took place near Ayutthaya, which would make Chedi Phu Khao Thong the likely place of this battle.

The area of the district was originally part of Si Prachan district. It was established as a minor district (king amphoe) on 1 January 1962, consisting of the two tambons, Don Chedi and Nong Sarai. It was upgraded to a full district on 27 July 1965.

Administration

Central administration 
Don Chedi is divided into five subdistricts (tambons), which are further subdivided into 50 administrative villages (mubans).

Local administration 
There are two subdistrict municipalities (thesaban tambons) in the district:
 Don Chedi consisting of parts of subdistrict Don Chedi.
 Sa Krachom consisting of parts of subdistrict Sa Krachom.

There are five subdistrict administrative organizations (SAO) in the district:
 Don Chedi consisting of parts of subdistrict Don Chedi.
 Nong Sarai consisting of subdistrict Nong Sarai.
 Rai Rot consisting of subdistrict Rai Rot.
 Sa Krachom consisting of parts of subdistrict Sa Krachom.
 Thale Bok consisting of subdistrict Thale Bok.

References

External links
amphoe.com

Don Chedi